Dunwoodie is a neighborhood in Yonkers, New York, noted for being the home of St. Joseph's Seminary and College on Valentine Hill. Dunwoodie (proper) is located north of the Seminary, while Dunwoodie Heights includes the seminary and what is south of it.  Dunwoodie also includes Yonkers' "Little Italy" and a public golf course.

Dunwoodie is noted for its pizzerias, among them, Louie and Johnnie's, Midland Pizza, and Dunwoodie Pizza.

The Yonkers Raceway is close by, located in Wakefield Park, while the Cross County Shopping Mall is also close by, but located in the neighborhood of Kimball.  St. Joseph's Seminary is located technically in the neighborhood of Seminary Heights, but it is colloquially known as Dunwoodie.

The Bee-Line Bus System has bus stops near the Cross County Shopping Center and Yonkers Raceway.  The neighborhood is also accessible by exit 3 on the I-87 (Major Deegan Expressway).  The Bronx River Parkway (to Exit 11W) and Cross County Expressway (exit 4S) are also nearby.

Intellectual life 
Dunwoodie has given its name to The Dunwoodie Review, a theological journal published at St. Joseph's Seminary.  The journal is a successor to the New York Review which was published by the seminary from 1905 to 1908. The Dunwoodie Review was published from 1961 to 1974 and, after a hiatus, annually from 1990 to the present.

References

External links

Yonkers Neighborhood Maps (City-Data.com)

Little Italys in the United States
Neighborhoods in Yonkers, New York